The N3 is a Bangladeshi national highway. Its  connect the Bangladeshi capital Dhaka with Mymensingh and Sherpur.

Junction list

The entire route is in Dhaka Division.

References

National Highways in Bangladesh